Papilio manlius is a species of butterfly in the family Papilionidae. It is endemic to Mauritius.

Description
The discal band of the forewing in both sexes only composed of three spots (in cellules 3, 4 and in the cell); that of the hindwing short, only covering the base of cellules 2 and 3 and there obliquely cut off; both wings above with blue submarginal spots; the forewing of the has, however, only very few of these. Mauritius.

Taxonomy
Papilio manlius belongs to an Afrotropical clade called the nireus species group with 15 members.  The pattern is black with green bands and spots and the butterflies, although called swallowtails lack tails with the exception of Papilio charopus and Papilio hornimani.  The clade members are:

Papilio aristophontes Oberthür, 1897
Papilio nireus Linnaeus, 1758
Papilio charopus Westwood, 1843
Papilio chitondensis de Sousa & Fernandes, 1966
Papilio chrapkowskii Suffert, 1904
Papilio chrapkowskoides Storace, 1952
Papilio desmondi van Someren, 1939
Papilio hornimani Distant, 1879
Papilio interjectana Vane-Wright, 1995
Papilio manlius Fabricius, 1798
Papilio microps Storace, 1951
Papilio sosia Rothschild & Jordan, 1903
Papilio thuraui Karsch, 1900
Papilio ufipa Carcasson, 1961
Papilio wilsoni Rothschild, 1926

References

Sources

External links 
 Butterfly corner Images from Naturhistorisches Museum Wien
 ARKive Papilio manlius

Insects of Mauritius
Endemic fauna of Mauritius
manlius
Butterflies described in 1798
Butterflies of Africa
Taxonomy articles created by Polbot